Redland City, better known as the Redlands and formerly known as Redland Shire, is a local government area and a part of the Brisbane metropolitan area in South East Queensland. With a population of 156,863 in June 2018, the city is spread along the southern coast of Moreton Bay, covering . Its mainland borders the City of Brisbane to the west and north-west, and Logan City to the south-west and south, while its islands are situated north of the City of Gold Coast.

Redland attained city status on 15 March 2008, having been a shire since 1949, when it was created by the merger of the former Tingalpa and Cleveland Shires. Despite this status, the City consists of largely suburban and coastal communities, featuring a somewhat disjointed urbanisation around major suburbs interspersed with bushland; there is no clear city centre.

Large mainland suburbs include Capalaba, Cleveland, Victoria Point, and Redland Bay. The latter is the city's namesake, due to the colour of its fertile soil. North Stradbroke Island and smaller nearby islands, most notably those of Southern Moreton Bay, comprise the eastern portion of the Redlands. The city's boundaries correspond to those of the federal division of Bowman.

History

The area now known as the Redlands was initially inhabited by the Jagera, Turrbal, and Quandamooka people. Some locations derive their names from Aboriginal languages, and known historic sites within the area include a bora ring at Mount Cotton. The Quandamooka are recognised as the traditional custodians of North Stradbroke Island, and more recently applied for native title over much of the Redlands' surrounding islands and mainland. Jandai (also known as Janday, Jandewal, Djendewal, Jundai, Goenpul and Jandawal), one of the Aboriginal languages of the Moreton Bay Region, has a language region  centred on Stradbroke Island, which falls within the local government boundaries of Redland City Council.

Europeans first entered the Redlands in the late 18th century while mapping Moreton Bay: James Cook made observations of the then-undivided Stradbroke Island; Matthew Flinders landed on Coochiemudlo Island in 1799; and Robert Dixon later surveyed and named much of the area.

By the 1840s, the coastal township of Cleveland was in contention to become a major port replacing Brisbane, but was ultimately not chosen due to the region's existing sandbars and shipwrecks, and an unfavourable review from Governor George Gipps during his 1842 visit. Louis Hope and other land purchasers began to develop significant infrastructure at this time. On 11 November 1879, under the Divisional Boards Act 1879, the Tingalpa Division was created to govern the area to the east of metropolitan Brisbane. The area around Cleveland split away to form the Cleveland Division on 30 May 1885. Under the Local Authorities Act 1902, both became Shires on 31 March 1903. The Tingalpa council met at Mount Cotton.

On 1 October 1925, a sizeable portion of the Shire of Tingalpa (suburbs west of Tingalpa Creek, including Upper Mount Gravatt and Rochedale) became part of the new City of Brisbane along with 20 other local governments. On 9 December 1948, as part of a major reorganisation of local government in South East Queensland, an Order in Council renamed the Shire of Cleveland to be Shire of Redland and amalgamated part of Shire of Tingalpa into it (the other part of Tingalpa amalgamated to form the Shire of Albert).

The twentieth century saw significant population growth in the Redlands, preceded by the construction of the Cleveland railway line. Peel Island became a leper colony, while North Stradbroke Island became a hub for sand mining, and is also associated with the Indigenous rights movement as the home of poet Oodgeroo Noonuccal and academic Aileen Moreton-Robinson. On 15 March 2008, Redlands was granted city status.

In June 2018, the Redland City Council approved a marketing campaign to brand the city as "Redlands Coast" with the tagline "naturally wonderful". The campaign seeks to attract tourists to the city's  of coastline (due to a number of islands which form part of the city).

Geography

Although most of the population resides on the main urban conglomeration based around the centres of Capalaba, Cleveland and Victoria Point, over 6,000 people live on islands in Moreton Bay that are part of the city.  These are North Stradbroke, Coochiemudlo and the Southern Moreton Bay Islands of Karragarra, Lamb, Russell and Macleay.  Tingalpa Creek rises on Mount Cotton, forming Leslie Harrison Dam, and marking the majority of the area's western boundary.

Environment
Redland City has many immediately recognisable animals and plants such as koalas, migratory shorebirds, flying foxes and scribbly gum forests. It is also home to over 1,700 other recorded native species, many of which are under threat from population growth and its associated effects such as habitat clearing and fragmentation, road construction, pollution and expanding development.  The council area is also home to Venman Bushland National Park, and the Eprapah Scout environment training centre.

In April 2013, the Redland City Council illegally cleared vegetation from public land on the foreshores of Moreton Bay. The council has been required by the State Government to restore the cleared vegetation and install signage about the restoration. Trees felled included many sheoaks.

The city's koala population has declined significantly in recent years. In 2010, it was estimated that only 2,000 koalas remained, a 65% decline since 1999. Figures from a count in 2012 have not yet been released by the Queensland Government. The Redland City-based Koala Action Group has warned that: "Rampant expansion of urban areas will lead to the loss of the koala populations that are vital to the long-term survival of the species."

The city boundaries include internationally significant coastal wetlands within the Moreton Bay Ramsar site. Tidal flats, mangroves and seagrass beds provide important habitats for fish, crustaceans, and:
 large numbers of the nationally threatened green turtle and the loggerhead turtle
 the internationally vulnerable dugong, a large sea mammal from the order Sirenia which also includes manatee species

 43 species of shorebirds, including 30 migratory bird species listed by international migratory bird conservation agreements, such as the vulnerable eastern curlew and the grey-tailed tattler, that use this area in their journey through the East Asian–Australasian Flyway.

Freshwater systems in the Redlands catchment do not meet set ecosystem health values, according to the Healthy Waterways Report Cards for both 2013 and 2014.

Fire ants have been detected in a number of Redland City suburbs, with Sheldon and Mount Cotton being assessed by BioSecurity Queensland as high-risk, and requiring treatment by ground teams.

Transport

Queensland Rail operates the Cleveland railway line, which connects the Redlands with Brisbane as part of its City network. The line runs parallel with the Brisbane River to its south, passing through Brisbane's Cannon Hill and Wynnum, before crossing Tingalpa Creek to enter Redland City. Northern suburbs of the city are serviced by five stations: Thorneside, Birkdale, Wellington Point, Ormiston, and Cleveland, where the line terminates.

The TransLink (South East Queensland) bus network is prevalent in the Redlands. Bus stations at Capalaba and Victoria Point feature regular city-bound and outbound connections, with direct services to Carindale, Eight Mile Plains, Loganholme, and the Brisbane CBD during peak hour. Upon pending completion, the Eastern Busway is expected to terminate at Capalaba bus station.

The Gateway Motorway and Pacific Motorway are located further west within the City of Brisbane. Major roads are accessible from these highways, such as Old Cleveland Road, Mount Gravatt-Capalaba Road, and Mount Cotton Road, which enter the Redlands from Chandler, Burbank, and Cornubia, respectively.

Culture and heritage

Redland City has a number of important cultural facilities, including the Redland Art Gallery, Redland Museum, and Redland Performing Arts Centre.

The city also has many heritage-listed sites, including:
 Multiple historic sites of Cleveland, such as the Cleveland Point Light, Old Cleveland Police Station, Cleveland Pioneer Cemetery, Grand View Hotel, and the historic pine trees near the Point
The church, public hall, causeway and public reserve in Dunwich, North Stradbroke Island
 Whepstead Manor at Wellington Point
The Industrial Ruins on Macleay Island
The Ormiston House Estate and Fellmongery
 Serpentine Creek Road Cemetery in Redland Bay.

Libraries 
The Redland City Council operate public libraries at Amity Point, Capalaba, Cleveland, Dunwich, Point Lookout, Russell Island and Victoria Point. There is a mobile library serving  Alexandra Hills, Mount Cotton Park, Redland Bay, Thorneside, Victoria Point, and Wellington Point.

Economy

For the year ending 30 June 2014, Redland City's Gross Regional Product (GRP) was estimated to be 4.77 billion dollars.

Key industry sectors include health care and social assistance, retail trade, education and training, sand mining, construction and tourism.

During the year ending in June 2014, an estimated 41,506 jobs were located in Redland City, along with an estimated 74,089 employed residents, meaning 32,035 (or 47.1%) of Redland City's employed residents who work travel outside of the area to do so.

Mining

North Stradbroke Island, one of the world's largest sand islands, has been the subject of sand mining operations since 1949. In 2010, Queensland's Labor Government announced a phase-out of the sand mining industry over a 17-year period, with up to 80% of the island to be covered by national park. In April 2011, the government then extended key expired mining leases to allow mining to continue at the main Enterprise sand mine until the end of 2019, while Sibelco was interested in an extension to 2027. 2013 saw the LNP Government pass legislation allowing sand mining on the island for an extra 16 years: from 2019 to 2035. For mining to continue past 2019 at the Enterprise sand mine, the lease owner (currently Sibelco) would have to apply for an extension in 2019, under legislative amendments passed by the Newman Government in November 2013. However, if the amendments are repealed by a future government before 2019, the mine will close on 31 December 2019, the closure date legislated by the government in April 2011.

The circumstances leading up to this legislative amendment have been referred to Queensland's Crime and Misconduct Commission. On 6 June 2014, North Stradbroke Island's traditional owners, the Quandamooka people, initiated a legal challenge saying, on the grounds that the LNP Government's extension of mining contravened the Federal Native Title Act. In May 2016, legislation passed by the Palaszczuk Ministry did confirm that sand mining on North Stradbroke will end by 2019.

Mainland quarries are located in the suburb of Mount Cotton, and have drawn their own criticisms concerning allegations of pollution and OHS breaches.

Development

Toondah Harbour in Cleveland is the location of the Stradbroke Island Ferry Terminal, used by water taxis and vehicular ferries to provide access to North Stradbroke Island. Cleveland's Toondah Harbour and Redland Bay's Weinam Creek were declared Priority Development Areas (PDAs) under the Economic Development Act 2012 on 21 June 2013. PDA designation allows development to be fast-tracked, but also means that local communities and interest groups have less opportunity to comment on issues of concern.

The Government and Redland City Council have proposed PDA development schemes which have attracted community opposition. On 23 February, approximately 30 people attended a rally to protest against the Government's plans to "carve up" the G.J. Walter Park as part of its Toondah Harbour redevelopment proposal. On 4 March 2014 a petition with 1,211 signatures calling for the Government's Toondah Harbour PDA plan to be withdrawn was tabled in the Queensland Parliament.

On 31 May 2014, an approved development scheme was released together with a lengthy report on the 583 submissions received during the consultation period.

On 18 September 2014, the Government and Council announced that Walker Corporation had been selected as preferred developer for both the Toondah Harbour and Weinam Creek priority development areas.

The median age was 41 years old, 3 years older than the nationwide median. The male-to-female ratio was 49-to-51. The most commonly nominated ancestries were English (32.1%), Australian (25.2%), Irish (9.0%), Scottish (8.6%), and German (4.5%). 72.5% of people were born in Australia, while the other most common countries of birth were England (6.7%), New Zealand (5.4%), South Africa (1.7%), Scotland (0.9%), and the Philippines (0.5%). Indigenous Australians accounted for 2.3% of the population. The most commonly spoken languages other than English were Afrikaans and Mandarin (0.5% each), German (0.4%), and Italian and Spanish (0.3% each). The most common religious affiliations reported were none (29.8%), Catholic (21.1%), Anglican (17.9%), and Uniting Church (6.1%).

Local government
Redland City Council has a Mayor, and a Councillor for each of its 10 divisions. Elections are held every four years and voting is compulsory.

Karen Williams was elected mayor at the 2012 election. She pledged to cap rate rises to inflation, control debt, abolish fees to dump rubbish at local tips, and make the council more transparent and accountable.

Williams was re-elected at the 2016 local government election and the 2020 local government elections.

Chairmen and mayors
(4 year terms since 2000, 3 years prior)
 Price, JHN: June 1949 – April 1961
 Wood, EGW: April 1961 – March 1982 
 Genrich, Merv: March 1982 – March 1991
 Keogh, Len: March 1991 – March 1994 
 Santagiuliana, Eddie: March 1994 – April 2001
 Seccombe, Don: June 2001 – March 2008
 Hobson, Melva: March 2008 – April 2012 
 Williams, Karen: April 2012 –

Other notable members of the Redland Council include:
 1961–1980: John Philip Goleby, Member of the Queensland Legislative Assembly for Redlands

Suburbs
Redland City consists of the following suburbs and localities:

 Alexandra Hills
 Birkdale
 Capalaba
 Cleveland
 Coochiemudlo Island
 Mount Cotton
 North Stradbroke Island
 Amity Point
 Dunwich
 Point Lookout
 Ormiston

 Redland Bay
 Sheldon
 Southern Moreton Bay Islands
 Karragarra Island
 Lamb Island
 Macleay Island
 Russell Island
 Thorneside
 Thornlands
 Victoria Point
 Wellington Point

Redland City also includes a number of uninhabited or sparsely populated islands in Moreton Bay, including:
 Peel Island
 Cassim Island, near Cleveland: a low-lying area of mangroves with seagrass around it which provides a high value habitat for wading birds and other fauna, named after William Cassim, an early Cleveland hotel keeper.

Population
The following table lists of the population of Redland City and its predecessor local government areas:.

References

Further reading

External links

 Redland City Council
 University of Queensland: Queensland Places: Redland City
 Queensland Government Department of Environment and Heritage Protection, Results of Search for Queensland Heritage Listed Places in Redland City

 
Local government areas in Brisbane
Coastal cities in Australia
Local government areas of Queensland